The Eleventh constituency for French residents overseas (onzième circonscription des Français établis hors de France) is one of eleven constituencies each electing one representative of French citizens overseas to the French National Assembly.

Area
In terms of area, it is the largest of the eleven constituencies, although it also contains fewer registered French citizens than any other constituency bar the Second. It covers all French citizens living in the following forty-nine countries, namely most of Asia, the whole of Oceania, and four countries of Eastern Europe (including Russia): Afghanistan, Armenia, Australia, Azerbaijan, Bangladesh, Belarus, Burma (Myanmar), Brunei, Cambodia, the People's Republic of China, East Timor, Fiji, Georgia, India, Indonesia, Iran, Japan, Kazakhstan, Kiribati, Kyrgyzstan, Laos, Malaysia, the Maldives, the Marshall Islands, the Federated States of Micronesia, Moldova, Mongolia, Nauru, Nepal, New Zealand, Pakistan, Palau, Papua New Guinea, the Philippines, Russia, Samoa, Singapore, Solomon Islands, South Korea, Sri Lanka, Tajikistan, Thailand, Tonga, Turkmenistan, Tuvalu, Ukraine, Vanuatu, and Vietnam. The constituency does not include Bhutan or North Korea, two countries with which France has no diplomatic relations, and which are therefore not part of any constituency. Taiwan is included as part of China, as France recognises the One China Policy.

It does not include the French overseas collectivities of French Polynesia, New Caledonia and Wallis and Futuna, which have their own constituencies.

As of New Year's Day 2011, the Eleventh constituency contained 114,826 registered French voters - of which 27,207 in China and 15,821 in Australia, the two countries in the region with the greatest number of registered French residents.

This constituency elected its first ever representative at the 2012 French legislative election.

Deputies

Election results

2022

2017

2012

Candidates
The list of candidates was officially finalised on 14 May. There were twenty candidates:

The Union for a Popular Movement chose Thierry Mariani, Secretary of State for Transport, as its candidate. Catya Martin was his deputy (suppléante).

The Socialist Party chose Marc Villard, a resident of Ho Chi Minh City and a businessman. His deputy was Laures Desmonts, a resident of Guangzhou.

Europe Écologie–The Greens chose Janick Magne, a long-term resident of Tokyo. Her deputy was William Kohler, a resident of China. Magne taught French at the Kyoritsu Women's University in Tokyo, and presented programmes in French on NHK Educational TV.

Laurent Ballouhey, of the French Communist Party, stood as the candidate of the Left Front, with Max Zins as his deputy.

The National Front chose Aude Bouveron, with Malik Berkane as her deputy.

The centre-right Radical Party and the centrist Republican, Ecologist and Social Alliance jointly chose Paul Dumont, CEO of Francom Asia  and a resident of Thailand, as their candidate. His deputy was Roman Masson.

The Radical Party of the Left chose Lisbeth Graille, an artist who had lived and travelled in Georgia and other parts of the Caucasus and Central Asia. Her deputy was Amélie Bizien.

Solidarity and Progress, the French branch of the LaRouche movement, was represented by Cécile Desmas, with Rémi Lebrun as his deputy.

Romain Arcizet, an engineer and resident of Laos, stood as a candidate representing his own newly established Constructive Independent Party (Parti indépendant constructif). His policy was to enable his constituents to choose his vote on any bill in Parliament, which he described as empowering voters beyond the election. His deputy was Nicolas Constant.

Sébastien Breteau was a miscellaneous right candidate, with Séverine Rod as his deputy.

Francis Nizet, who ran a computer services business in Cambodia, was the candidate of the Union for French Democracy. He had also lived and worked in Côte d'Ivoire, Cameroon and China. Catherine Jackson-Grose was his deputy.

Ludovic Chaker, a resident of China, stood as a "social-democratic independent" candidate. Key points in his program were support to bi-national families, support to French entrepreneurs developing or expanding businesses in the Asia-Pacific region, improving healthcare delivery for overseas residents and promoting the contribution made by French people overseas to the interests of the country. His deputy was Michèle Jullian.

Thibault Danjou stood as an "independent centre-right / liberal right" candidate. A resident of Singapore, and former resident of Tokyo, he was a marketing consultant on the exporting of glass. He was a member of the Democratic Movement and of the Liberal Democratic Party, although he was only endorsed by the Liberal Democratic Party. His deputy was Anne-Marie Tezenas du Montcel.

Antoine Bergeot, a notary working "in the Pacific", was an independent candidate, who said he would sit with the right in Parliament if elected. His deputy was Jérôme Chatenay.

Olivier Toison, a businessman, stood as an independent on a platform of economic liberalism. His deputy was Anne-Laure Toison.

The other independent candidates were: Aurélien Lesluye (with Jacques de Soyres as deputy); Alain Peria (with Richard Wright); Idrisse Mohamed (with Favzia Mohamed); Alavandane Ramakichenane (with a deputy identified only as "Bacta"); and Jean-Loup Fayolle (with Corentin Joyeux).

Results
As in the other expatriate constituencies, turnout in the first round was low. Only in five countries did half or more of registered French citizens vote: Tajikistan (66.7%), Moldova (61.8%), Uzbekistan (57.8%) Burma (55.2%), and Brunei (50%). These were small communities - fewer than 150 registered adults in each. In countries with a sizable expatriate community, turnout tended to be low: 21.1% in Australia, 29.3% in China, 30.5% in India, 33.4% in Japan, 31.4% in Russia, 39.7% in Singapore, 29.1% in Thailand, and 24.3% in Vietnam. Turnout was lowest in Vanuatu (11.4%) and in Iran (15.3%).

This is one of only three expatriate constituencies in which the main candidate of the right finished first in the first round. UMP candidate Thierry Mariani finished first overall, although he was beaten by Socialist candidate Marc Villard in a number of countries - most notably India, Japan, New Zealand, Pakistan (narrowly) and Vietnam. Francis Nizet's third place, with 9.21% of the vote, was the best result for a Democratic Movement-affiliated party in any of the expatriate constituencies.

References

11